Ranjeeta Koli (born 9 May 1979) is an Indian politician. She was elected to the Lok Sabha, lower house of the Parliament of India from  Bharatpur, Rajasthan in the 2019 Indian general election as a member of the Bharatiya Janata Party. She won the election by getting 707992 votes which was nearly 61.74% of the votes.
She is new to politics but she belongs to a political family. Her father in law Gangaram Koli was three time MP from Bayana Lok Sabha constituency from 1991 to 1998.

References

External links
 Official biographical sketch in Parliament of India website

India MPs 2019–present
Lok Sabha members from Rajasthan
Living people
Bharatiya Janata Party politicians from Rajasthan
People from Bharatpur, Rajasthan
Women in Rajasthan politics
1979 births
Women members of the Lok Sabha
21st-century Indian women politicians